Teemu Kivihalme (born June 17, 1995) is an American-Finnish professional ice hockey defenseman who is currently playing with HC TPS of the Finnish Liiga. He was selected by the Nashville Predators in the fifth round, 140th overall, of the 2013 NHL Entry Draft.

Playing career
Kivihalme played junior hockey with the Fargo Force of the United States Hockey League (USHL) when he was selected in the fifth round, 140th overall, of the 2013 NHL Entry Draft by the Nashville Predators. Committing to a collegiate career with Colorado College, Kivihalme played three seasons with the Tigers from 2014 to 2017, totalling 36 points in 107 NCAA games.

Un-signed from the Predators, Kivihalme returned to his Finnish roots, in beginning his professional career with Oulun Kärpät of the Finnish Liiga. In the 2017–18 season, Kivihalme quickly established himself as a regular on the blueline for the contending Kärpät. He scored 4 goals and 20 points in 44 games, and appeared in each post-season contest in helping capture the Liiga championship.

In 60 games during the 2018–19 season, Kivihalme built upon his rookie year in recording 9 goals and 21 assists for 30 points, which ranked ninth among Liiga defencemen in scoring. He contributed with 9 points in 16 playoff games in helping Oulu return to the Liiga Championship finals.

On May 7, 2019, Kivihalme gained NHL interest and was signed to a one-year, entry-level contract with the Toronto Maple Leafs.

On August 8, 2022, Kivihalme signed a one-year contract with HC TPS of the Finnish Liiga for the following 22-23 season.

Personal life
Kivihalme was born in the United States to a Finnish father, Janne Kivihalme, and an American mother, Shanda Christie, and is a dual citizen of Finland and the US. His father played collegiate hockey with the University of Wisconsin–Superior.

Career statistics

Regular season and playoffs

International

Awards & honors

References

External links
 

1995 births
Living people
American men's ice hockey defensemen
American people of Finnish descent
Colorado College Tigers men's ice hockey players
Oulun Kärpät players
Finnish ice hockey players
Finnish people of American descent
Fargo Force players
Ice hockey players from Minnesota
Nashville Predators draft picks
Toronto Marlies players
HC TPS players